Stark Raving Mad is a 1981 American crime film directed by George F. Hood, written by Don Gronquist, and starring Russ Faust and Marcie Severson. It depicts a fictionalized account of the Charles Starkweather and Caril Ann Fugate killings of the 1950s. It was released in January 1983.

Plot 

The film opens with convicted serial killer Richard Stark on death row and awaiting execution. While he waits in the death cell, he begins to relate the story of the circumstances that led to his present situation.

Release 

The film was released in Canada as Execution and in Australia as Murder Run.

See also 
 Badlands, a 1973 film about the Charles Starkweather murders

References

External links
 

1981 films
1981 crime drama films
American crime drama films
Biographical films about serial killers
1980s drama road movies
American drama road movies
Cultural depictions of male serial killers
Cultural depictions of American men
1980s English-language films
1980s American films